Trivelpiece Island is an island in Wylie Bay, located northeast of Halfway Island. Named for Wayne Z. Trivelpiece and Susan Green Trivelpiece, who studied seabird ecology in the Antarctic Peninsula area for over twenty years.

See also 
 List of Antarctic and sub-Antarctic islands

References 

Islands of the Palmer Archipelago